The Minister of Mineral Resources and Energy is a minister in the cabinet of the South African national government. The portfolio was called the Ministry of Minerals and Energy until May 2009, when President Jacob Zuma split it into two separate portfolios under the Ministry of Mining (later the Ministry of Mineral Resources) and the Ministry of Energy. Ten years later, in May 2019, his successor President Cyril Ramaphosa reunited the portfolios as the Ministry of Mineral Resources and Energy.

The current minister is Gwede Mantashe, who was appointed to the position when the portfolios were reunified and who had been Minister of Mineral Resources before then. He is the political head of the Department of Mineral Resources and Energy, which was formed in a merger in June 2019.

History
The Ministry of Minerals and Energy existed as a position in the apartheid government and was retained in the Government of National Unity (GNU) after the first democratic elections in 1994. When the National Party resigned from the GNU, there was a cabinet reshuffle, in which Pik Botha was replaced. Since then, every incumbent of the ministry has been a member of the ruling African National Congress.

When Zuma took office in May 2009, he separated the Department of Minerals and Energy into the Department of Mining and the Department of Energy, overseen by the Minister of Mining and the Minister of Energy respectively. The Minister of Mining became known as the Minister of Mineral Resources from the beginning of his second cabinet in May 2014, and the department was also renamed accordingly. During Zuma's presidency, there were a number of cabinet reshuffles, affecting the energy portfolio in particular. The dismissals of energy ministers were linked by commentators to Zuma's efforts to gain approval for a proposed nuclear power deal with Russia.

When Ramaphosa replaced Zuma in February 2018, he retained the separate mineral resources and energy portfolios during his first cabinet, but, after being re-elected pursuant to the 2019 general election, he united the ministerial portfolios and, shortly afterwards, the departments.

List of Ministers

1994–2009: Minister of Minerals and Energy

Susan Shabangu was deputy minister for the duration of Maduna and Mlambo-Ngcuka's tenure as minister. Mlambo-Ngcuka and Shabangu were the portfolio's first female minister and deputy minister respectively, and theirs was the first ministry in the history of the South African government in which both top positions were filled by women. Lulu Xingwana succeeded Shabangu as deputy minister under Hendricks.

2009–2019: Separate portfolios

Minister of Mineral Resources

Godfrey Oliphant was deputy minister between November 2010 and May 2019.

Minister of Energy

Barbara Thomson was deputy minister of energy between November 2010 and May 2014, when she was succeeded by Thembi Majola, who remained in the position until December 2018.

2019–present: Minister of Mineral Resources and Energy

References

External links
Ministry page in government directory
Department page in government directory
Department of Mineral Resources and Energy website

South Africa
South Africa